"The Brain of Colonel Barham" (original title: "The Brain of Donald Duncan") is an episode of the original The Outer Limits television show. It first aired on 2 January 1965, during the second season. The episodes reunite the two former leads of Hawaiian Eye, Grant Williams and Anthony Eisley.

Opening narration
"With the world growing more crowded, the great powers strive to conquer other planets. The race is on. The interplanetary sea has been charted; the first caravelle of space is being constructed. Who will get there first? Who will be the new Columbus?"

Plot
The space race continues as the American military strives to be the first to successfully land a man on Mars. But the best candidate for the job, Col. Barham, is dying of an incurable ailment that has left him unable to walk. There is great debate whether a human being could survive a trip to Mars and whether a computer could adapt to unforeseen circumstances. It is decided to separate the Colonel's brain from his body and keep it alive, with neural implants connecting it to visual and audio input/output for the mission combining an astronaut's brain with a computer. But without a body, the brain becomes extremely powerful and develops megalomaniacal tendencies that endanger the life of his wife and others.

Closing narration
"Progress goes on. One experiment fails, but even out of failure valuable lessons are learned. A way will be found, someday, somehow. It always is."

Cast

The Outer Limits (1963 TV series season 2) episodes
1965 American television episodes
Works about astronauts